Misti Cheler Dustu Buddhi (sometimes Mishti Cheler Dustu Buddhi) is a 2013 Bengali comedy film directed by Partha sarathi Manna and produced by Bidyut Chakraborty under the banner of Nupur Creations. Music of the film has been composed by Dodo and Tamal. The film was released on 4 January 2013.

Plot
Misti Cheler Dustu Buddhi is actually about three thieves, Kalicharan and his two sidekicks, Puti and Baka who decide to rob and go back to their old tricks after Kalicharan is released from jail. They decide to rob the occupants of the Mitra household: an elderly man, Pradosh Mitra, his two sons and their families. They decide to carry out the robbery at a time when the house will have no occupants according to information received by them. Accordingly, they act. But they couldn't be successful because, unknown to them, Pradosh and one of his grandsons, 7 year old Som have decided to stay back and create havoc for them. All their efforts to rob the house are in vain as little Som turns out to be more than a handful for all of them.

Cast
 Abhishek Chatterjee
 Bhola Tamang
 Prasun Gayen
 Anjana Das
 Raju Majumdar
 Indranil Sen
 Nupur
 Hiran Chatterjee (special appearance)

Soundtrack
The soundtrack of Misti Cheler Dustu Buddhi is composed by Tamal and Dodo. The film has 5 songs which include 4 original songs and 1 remix.

Track list

See also
 Maach Mishti & More
 Target Kolkata
 Deewana
 Shunyo Awnko

References

Bengali-language Indian films
2010s Bengali-language films
2013 films